Kälberbach may refer to:

Kälberbach (Neuburg am Inn), a district of Neuburg am Inn, Bavaria, Germany
Kälberbach (Schrozberg), a hamlet, part of Schrozberg, Baden-Württemberg, Germany
Kälberbach (Seemenbach), river of Hesse, Germany, tributary of the Seemenbach
Kälberbach (Elbbach), a river of Rhineland-Palatinate, Germany, tributary of the Elbbach
Kälberbach (Werse), a river of  North Rhine-Westphalia, Germany, tributary of the Werse